Beauty Mark is a 2017 American drama film written and directed by Harris Doran. Inspired by true events, the film follows a poverty-stricken young mother who has to get money from a man from her abusive past in order to save her family. The film explores the interconnected themes of abuse, cycles of abuse, systemic poverty, addiction, and race.

The film won multiple awards including the Jury Prize for "Breakout Performance" for its star Auden Thornton at the Los Angeles Film Festival premiere, the Ultra Indie Film Award at Woodstock Film Festival for its director Harris Doran, and the Audience Award for Best Feature Film at the Austin Film Festival.

Plot 
 
Set in the Portland area of downtown Louisville, Kentucky, the film follows Angie Simms (Auden Thornton), a poverty-stricken young mother  taking care of her three-year-old son Trey (Jameson Fowler) and her alcoholic mother (Catherine Curtin). She works at a convenience store which Lorraine (Laura Bell Bundy), a dancer at a local club, frequents. Lorraine insists the men "ain't using me, I'm using them." Angie finds out the house her family is living in is condemned and they must move immediately. Out of options, she decides to try to sue Bruce (Jeff Kober) a man who abused her as a child, only to find out that at twenty-four, she is one year past the statute of limitations under Kentucky law.

She seeks help from Zachariah (Radney Foster) the father of a childhood friend, Pastor Hodges (Deirdre Lovejoy), Kaylee (Paten Hughes) a childhood acquaintance, and Pam (Madison Iseman) a girl a few years younger than she.

Cast 

 Auden Thornton as Angie Simms
 Catherine Curtin as Ruth Ann Simms
 Laura Bell Bundy as Lorraine
 Jeff Kober as Bruce
 Madison Iseman as Pam
 Deirdre Lovejoy as Pastor Hodges
 Jameson Fowler as Trey
 Tim Morton as Wyatt
 Paten Hughes as Kaylee
 Ben Curtis as Billy
 Wynn Reichert as Ray
 Radney Foster as Zachariah
  Mike Schroerlucke as Inspector

Release 
The film premiered at the Los Angeles Film Festival and was shown at Woodstock Film Festival, Austin Film Festival, St. Louis International Film Festival, Bahamas International Film Festival, San Luis Obispo International Film Festival, SENE Film, Music & Art Festival. The film was acquired by The Orchard and released On Digital and On Demand May 22, 2018.

Critical reception 
 
Director Harris Doran was shortlisted for the Independent Spirit Awards Someone To Watch Award for his work on Beauty Mark. A day after its digital release, the film hit #14 on the iTunes Top Independent Film chart.

Ashley Judd said of the film, "Powerful film. Survivors must no longer be silent."

Awards and nominations

References

External links 

 
 
 

2017 films
2017 independent films
American independent films
Films about dysfunctional families
Films about child abuse
Films about child sexual abuse
Films about poverty in the United States
Films set in Kentucky
Films shot in Kentucky
American drama films
2017 directorial debut films
2010s English-language films
2010s American films